Graham Charles Dewes (born 24 January 1982 in Suva) is a Fijian rugby union player. He plays as a prop.

Career
Dewes got his first cap for Fiji on 26 May 2007 in a 30–15 win over Japan. He was a member of the Fiji squad that entered the 2007 Rugby World Cup finals, playing in four matches and scoring the winning try in the 38–34 win over Wales putting Fiji through to their first quarter final in 20 years. Fiji lost that quarter final to eventual winners South Africa despite drawing 20-all for a period in the 2nd half. He had 7 caps by the end of the competition. His mother is Rotuman from Noa'tau, Rotuma. Before his selection into the 2007 squad he had only played third division rugby in the NPC in New Zealand. He played in Auckland's age grades through to U-23s, and Thames Valley in the NPC. He played for Counties Manukau Steelers in New Zealand.

Coaching career 
On November 2022, Dewes was named as Fiji's new forwards coach.

References

External links
Fiji profile
Scrum profile

1982 births
Living people
Fijian rugby union players
Rugby union props
Fiji international rugby union players
Fijian expatriate rugby union players
Expatriate rugby union players in New Zealand
Fijian expatriate sportspeople in New Zealand
Fijian people of Rotuman descent
Sportspeople from Suva
Fijian people of British descent